The Iran men's national Under-17 basketball team is the national Under-17 men's basketball team of Iran.

Tournament records

FIBA Asia Under-16 Championship Record 
 2009: 3rd place 
 2011: Qualified but withdrew
 2013: 6th
 2015: Did not participate
 2017: 7th (Best Scoring Team)
 2019: cancel
 2021: 8th

FIBA Under-17 World Championship Record 
2010: Did not qualify
2012: Did not qualify
2014: Did not qualify
2016: Did not qualify
2018: Did not qualify

Roster

External links
 Iran Basketball Federation

under-19
Men's national under-17 basketball teams